Eric Ocansey (born 22 August 1997) is a Ghanaian football player who plays for Belgian club Kortrijk as a winger.

Club career
Eric Ocansey started his career with Eupen.

On 31 January 2022, Ocansey joined Waasland-Beveren on loan until the end of the 2021–22 season.

Career statistics

References

External links
 
 

1997 births
Living people
Ghanaian footballers
Association football wingers
K.A.S. Eupen players
K.V. Kortrijk players
S.K. Beveren players
Belgian Pro League players
Challenger Pro League players
Ghanaian expatriate footballers
Ghanaian expatriate sportspeople in Belgium
Expatriate footballers in Belgium